Cuisine  of Uttar Pradesh is from the state of Uttar Pradesh (UP) located in Northern India.  Uttar Pradesh is famous for its beauty. The cuisine of UP has a large variety of dishes. The cuisine consists of both vegetarian and non-vegetarian dishes of different varieties. Being a large state, the cuisine of UP share lot of dishes and recipes with the neighboring states of Delhi, Uttarakhand, and Haryana. Apart from native cuisine, Mughlai, Awadhi and Bhojpuri are famous subtypes of cuisine of the state.

Bread
As wheat is the staple food of the state, breads are very significant. Breads are generally flat breads; only a few varieties are raised breads. The breads may be made of different types of flour and can be made in various ways. Popular breads include tandoori naan (naan baked in a tandoor), tandoori roti, kulcha, taftan, sheermal, rumali roti, poori,
paratha, millet (millet flour flatbread), lachha paratha and poori aka oil-fried roti

Common food

Biryani
Boondi
Chaat has its root from Uttar Pradesh
Chicken Biryani
Dum Bhindi (Fried whole okra stuffed with spiced potato filling)
Egg Curry
Kofta
Korma
Lotpot
Mutton Biryani

Nihari
Pakora
Palak Paneer
Pasanda Kabab (skewered boneless mutton)
Pasanda Paneer (similar to Paneer Makhani or butter paneer (Indian cheese)
Poori
Raita
Rajma
Chole(Chickpea curry)
Samosa
Shab Deg (a winter dish, turnips and mutton balls with saffron)
Kalmi Kebab
Shami Kabab (includes tangy green mango)
Sohan Halwa specially in Rampur state
Petha 
Tehri (vegetarian rice dish with spices and mixed vegetables)

Traditional desserts
 

Balushahi
Barfi
Chhena
Gajar ka Halwa
Ghevar
Gujia
Gulab Jamun

Halwa
Imarti
Jalebi
Kaju Katli
Kalakand
Kheer
Kulfi
Laddu

Malpua
Peda
Petha
Rabadi 
Ras Malai
Sheer Khorma

Common beverages

Bhaang
Chhaas
Lassi
Raita
Sharbat
Thandai

See also
 Indian cuisine
 North Indian cuisine
 Awadhi cuisine
 Bhojpuri cuisine
 Mughlai cuisine

References

External links

Uponline.in
Food.indif.com

Indian cuisine
Indian cuisine by state or union territory